Tambralinga was an Indianised kingdom located on the Malay Peninsula, existing at least from the 10th to 13th century. It was under the influence of Srivijaya for some time, but later became independent from it. The name had been forgotten until scholars recognized Tambralinga as Nakhon Si Thammarat (Nagara Sri Dharmaraja). In Sanskrit and Prakrit,  tām(b)ra means "copper", "copper-coloured" or "red" and linga means "symbol" or "creation", typically representing the divine energy of Shiva.

Tambralinga first sent an embassy to China under the Song dynasty in 1001. In the 12th century it may or may not have been under the suzerainty of the Burmese Pagan Kingdom and a kingdom of Sri Lanka. At its height in the mid-13th century, under King Chandrabhanu, Tambralinga was independent, regrouping and consolidating its power and even invading Sri Lanka. By the end of the 13th century, Tambralinga was recorded in Siamese history as Nakhon Si Thammarat, under the suzerainty of the Tai Sukhothai Kingdom.

Tambralinga in records 
The Chinese Songhuiyaogao chronicle mentions a country named Danliumei (Tan-liu-mei), stating many details during the period from 970 to 1070. It gives the impression that the kingdom was an independent state at that time, sending embassies to the court of China under the Song dynasty in 1001, 1016 and 1070. Danliumei is assumed to be a Chinese rendering of Tambralinga, the location of that state however is not precisely described. The chronicle of Ma Duanlin and the Songshi, mention similarly named states, Zhoumeiliu (Chou-mei-liu) and Danmeiliu (Tan-liu-mei) respectively, that are also reported to have sent their first mission to China in 1001, which makes it likely that they refer to the same state.

In his 13th-century work Zhu Fan Zhi, Chinese historian Zhao Rugua mentions the state Danmaling (Tan-ma-ling), describing it as a vassal of Srivijaya. Whether Danmaling can be identified with Tambralinga is dubious; sinologist Roderich Ptak proposes instead to locate it in the Tembeling region of Pahang.

An indigenous source of Tambralinga history is an inscription dating to 1183, written in Old Khmer, engraved on the base of a bronze Buddha statue found at Wat Hua Wiang in Chaiya District, Surat Thani Province. It gives an impression of the political situation of Tambralinga in the late-twelfth century. Another important source is a Sanskrit inscription ascribed to King Chandrabhanu of Tambralinga, dated 1230. It gives the king the epithet "Śrī Dharmarāja", which is an evidence for the identification of Tambralinga with Nakhon Si Thammarat (Nagara Śrī Dharmarāja in Sanskrit).

Golden age 

 
According to the inscription No. 24 found at Hua-wieng temple in Chaiya near Nakhon Si Thammarat, the ruler of Tambralinga named Chandrabhanu Sridhamaraja was the king of Padmavamsa (Lotus dynasty). He began to reign in 1230, he had the Phra Borommathat (chedi in Nakhon Si Thammarat, from Sanskrit dhatu - element, component, or relic + garbha - storehouse or repository) reparation and celebration in the same year. Chandrabhanu Sridhamaraja brought Tambralinga to the pinnacle of its power in the mid-13th century. From the Sri Lankan and Tamil materials, records, and sources, Chandrabhanu was a Savakan king from Tambralinga who had invaded Sri Lanka in 1247. His navy launched an assault on the southern part of the island but was defeated by the Sri Lankan king.

However Chandrabhanu was able to establish an independent regime in the north of the island over the Jaffna kingdom, but in 1258 he was attacked and subjugated by the Tamil Emperor Jatavarman Sundara Pandyan. He was compelled to pay a tribute to 
the Pandyan dynasty of precious jewels and elephants. In 1262 Chandrabhanu launched another attack on the south of the island, his army strengthened this time by the addition of Tamil and Sinhalese forces, only to be defeated when Pandya sided with the Sri Lankan side; this time Jatarvarman Sundara Pandyan's brother Jatavarman Veera Pandyan intervened and Chandrabhanu himself was killed in the fighting. Chandrabhanu's son Savakanmaindan inherited the throne and submitted to Veera Pandyan's rule, received rewards and retained control over the northern kingdom. His regime too had disappeared following Maravarman Kulasekara Pandyan I's ascension to the Pandyan empire's throne and another invasion of the island by the army of the Pandyan dynasty in the late 1270s. Maravarman Kulasekara Pandyan I installed his minister in charge of the invasion, Kulasekara Cinkaiariyan, an Aryachakravarti as the new king of Jaffna.

In at least two senses, the rapid expansion of Tambralinga is exceptional in the history of Southeast Asia. In the first place, Candrabhanu's invasion of Sri Lanka and occupation of the Jaffna kingdom marks the only time that a Southeast Asian power has launched an overseas military expedition beyond the immediate Southeast Asian region. In the second place, in the historiography of Southeast Asia, southern Thailand has generally played a secondary role to that of places like Java, Sumatra, the Malacca Strait region (Srivijaya in the seventh~eighth century, Melaka in the 15th century), Cambodia, Champa, Vietnam, and Burma. Tambralinga's sudden appearance on centre-stage in the 13th century was thus highly unusual.

Decline 
By the end of the 14th century, Tambralinga had been subsumed by the Sumatran Melayu Kingdom which had the backing of Java. Finally, in 1365 Majapahit Kingdom of Java recognized Nakorn Sri Dharmaraja as Dharmanagari written in Nagarakretagama. Despite its rapid rise to prominence in the 13th century, that is, by the following century Danmaling, or Tambralinga, the former member state of Sanfoshih – Javaka, had become a part of Siam.

Heritage and restoration 

The city chronicle mentions a fortification when the town was refounded in 1278. The Ram Khamhaeng inscription of 1283 lists Nakhon Si Thammarat as one of the tributary kingdoms of Sukhothai. In the Old Javanese Desawarnana document of 1365, the Majapahit kingdom also recognised Nakhon Si Thammarat as belonging to Siam. In the Palatinate Law of King Trailok dated 1468, Nakhon Si Thammarat was listed as one of eight great cities (Phraya maha nakhon) belonging to the Ayutthaya Kingdom. During the reign of King Naresuan (r. 1590–1605) it became a first class province (Mueang Ek).

Restorations were recorded at the time of King Ramesuan (1388–1395), as well as King Narai (1656–1688) of Ayutthaya. The latter one was supported by the French engineer M. de la Mare.

The walls of the town spread 456 meters from east to west, and 2,238 meters north to south, thus enclosing an area of about one square kilometre. The northern wall had only one gate, called Pratu Chai Nuea or Pratu Chai Sak, while the southern wall also had only one gate. To the east there were three gates, which connected the town with the sea. To the west were five gates. Today only the northern gate still exists, together with a short stretch of the northern city wall.

See also
 Naksat cities

References

Further reading 
 
 
 ; also printed in 

 
Former countries in Thai history
11th-century establishments in Thailand
13th-century disestablishments in Thailand
History of Malaysia
Indianized kingdoms